Lupton is an unincorporated community in Walker County, Alabama, United States.

History
Lupton is home to Lupton School, an elementary/middle school that is part of the Walker County Board of Education.

Notes

Unincorporated communities in Walker County, Alabama
Unincorporated communities in Alabama